Plumley is a village in Cheshire, England.

Plumley may also refer to:

People 
Plumley (surname)

See also
 Plumley railway station, Plumley, Cheshire, England
 Plumlee, surname
 Plumbley (disambiguation)